The Seychelles National Movement was a political movement created by the exiled Seychellois leader Gérard Hoarau who was based in London in the 1980s. 

The movement was the follow up to the MPR or Mouvement Pour La Resistance which was an underground movement again created by Gérard Hoarau when he was still living in the Seychelles. The MPR was a direct response by the resistance to the newly installed one party government of France-Albert René who seized power on 5 June 1977.

History of Seychelles